Four Town Lake is a lake in Itasca County, in the U.S. state of Minnesota.

Four Town Lake was named from the fact parts of the lake are located in four townships.

See also
List of lakes of Minnesota

References

Lakes of Minnesota
Lakes of Itasca County, Minnesota